Gelao may refer to:

 Gelao language
 Gelao people, an ethnic group of China and Vietnam
 Gelao,, an official post in ancient Chinese governments